Deng Zeqi (born October 15, 1991) is a Chinese Muay Thai kickboxer who fights out of Da Dong Xiang fight club. He holds notable victories over Lerdsila Chumpairtour, Rungravee Sasiprapa, Sergio Wielzen, and Chan Hyung Lee. Deng has fought under the Wu Lin Feng, Glory of Heroes, and Krush banner.

Career 

November 14, 2012 in Las Vegas, Nevada WCK Muay Thai "Wulinfeng Spectacular", Deng Zeqi defeated Lerdsila Chumpairtour to win the Lightweight WCK Muaythai World Championship -60 kg belt via split decision.

December 5, 2015 in Zhengzhou, Henan WLF World Championship 2015 -63 kg Tournament, Finals, Deng Zeqi challenged Wei Rui for the WLF World Championship 2015 –63 kg belt after defeating Rungravee Sasiprapa by knockout in the semi-finals of the competition. The fight was declared a draw which led to the fight going for an extra round where he was knocked out by Wei Rui by TKO via punches.

July 7, 2018 in Guangdong, China Glory of Heroes 32: Huizhou - GOH 63 kg Championship Tournament, Finals, Deng Zeqi challenged Wei Rui in a rematch, this time for GOH 63 kg Championship belt but had once again lost by knockout.

Championships and awards 

Muay Thai
WCK Muaythai 
2012 WCK Muaythai Lightweight World Champion -60 kg 
Amateur Muay Thai
2011 National Muay Thai Champion -60 kg

Kickboxing
Wu Lin Feng
2015 WLF World Championship Champions -63 kg Runner- Up
Glory of Heroes
2018 GOH Junior Featherweight (-63kg) World Champion Tournament Runner- Up
Hong Kong Fight Night
2011 Hong Kong Fight Night King's Gold belt

Kickboxing record

|-  style="background:#fbb;"
| 2020-12-26 || Loss||align=left| Supajie || Rise of Heroes   || China || Ext.R TKO (Leg injury) || 3 || 3:00
|-  style="background:#cfc;"
| 2020-01-11 || Win ||align=left| Kachoenram Aniwat || Glory of Heroes 46  || Wenzhou, China || Decision || 3 || 3:00
|-  style="background:#cfc;"
| 2019-12-28 || Win ||align=left| Sergei || Glory of Heroes 44  || Shenzhen, China || Decision || 3 || 3:00
|-  style="background:#cfc;"
| 2019-06-22 || Win ||align=left| Victor Mikhailov || Glory of Heroes 39  || Xinyi, China || TKO (Punches) ||  ||
|-  style="background:#cfc;"
| 2019-05-04 || Win ||align=left| Hafiz Karimi || Fight Time || Xinyi, China || TKO  || 2 ||
|-  style="background:#cfc;"
| 2018-09-15 || Win ||align=left| Italo Freitas || Glory of Heroes 34: Tongling  || Anhui, China || TKO (Punches) || 2 ||
|-  style="background:#cfc;"
| 2018-07-28 || Win ||align=left| Elfazar Fazaraly|| Glory of Heroes 33: Shanghai  || Shanghai, China || Decision (Unanimous)  || 3 || 3:00
|-  style="background:#fbb;"
| 2018-07-07 || Loss ||align=left| Wei Rui || Glory of Heroes 32: Huizhou - GOH 63 kg Championship Tournament, Finals || Guangdong, China || KO (left knee to the body) || 2 || 1:58
|-
! style=background:white colspan=9 |For the GOH Junior Featherweight (-63kg) World Champion.
|-  style="background:#cfc;"
| 2018-01-27|| Win ||align=left| Melnyk Vladyslav || Glory of Heroes: Qingdao || Qingdao, China || Decision (Unanimous) || 3 || 3:00
|-  style="background:#cfc;"
| 2018-01-06|| Win || align=left| Cristian Spetcu || Glory of Heroes: Wudang Mountain || Hubei, China || Ext. R Decision || 4 || 3:00
|-  style="background:#cfc;"
| 2017-11-18 || Win||align=left| Hiwa Attari || Glory of Heroes: China VS Switzerland || Martigny, Switzerland || Decision (unanimous) ||3 || 3:00
|-  style="background:#fbb;"
| 2017-07-16|| Loss||align=left| Rukiya Anpo || Krush.77 || Tokyo, Japan || KO (Flying Knee) || 1 || 2:53
|-  style="background:#cfc;"
| 2017-03-04 || Win||align=left| Hector Santiago || Glory of Heroes 7 || Sao Paulo, Brazil || TKO (Ref. Stoppage/Punches) ||3 ||
|-  style="background:#cfc;"
| 2017-01-14|| Win || align=left| Stavros Exakoustidis || Glory of Heroes 6 || Jiyuan, China || TKO (right hook)|| 2 || 0:10
|-  style="background:#cfc;"
| 2016-10-15|| Win||align=left|  Cristian Miguel Llobregat  || Rise of Heroes 2 || Zhangshu, China || TKO || 1 ||
|-  style="background:#fbb;"
| 2016-08-06|| Loss || align=left| Stavros Exakoustidis || Glory of Heroes 4 || Changzhi, China || TKO || 2 ||
|-  style="background:#cfc;"
| 2016-07-02|| Win ||align=left| Chan Hyung Lee || Glory of Heroes 3 || China || Decision (unanimous) || 3 || 3:00
|-  style="background:#cfc;"
| 2016-05-07|| Win||align=left| Artur Makouski || Glory of Heroes 2 || Shenzhen, China || Decision (unanimous) || 3 || 3:00
|-  style="background:#cfc;"
| 2016-04-02|| Win||align=left| Joan Manuel Lique Canaveral || Glory of Heroes 1 || Shenzhen, China || KO (left hook) || 1 ||
|-  style="background:#fbb;"
| 2016-01-23 || Loss||align=left|  Jomthong Chuwattana || Wu Lin Feng  || Shanghai, China || KO (left cross) || 1 ||
|-  style="background:#fbb;"
| 2015-12-05 || Loss || align=left| Wei Rui || WLF World Championship 2015 -63 kg Tournament, Finals || Zhengzhou, China || TKO (punches) || 4 ||  
|- 
! style=background:white colspan=9 |For the WLF World Championship Champions -63 kg.
|-  style="background:#cfc;"
| 2015-12-05 || Win ||align=left| Rungravee Sasiprapa || Wu Lin Feng -63 kg tournament semifinal || China || KO (right hook) || 1 || 3:00
|-  style="background:#cfc;"
| 2015-11-13 || Win ||align=left| Lerdsila Chumpairtour || Wu Lin Feng & WCK Muaythai: China vs USA || Las Vegas, USA || Decision || 3 || 3:00
|-  bgcolor="#cfc"
| 2015-11-07 || Win ||align=left| Zhao Yongxiang || Wu Lin Feng 2015 –63 kg World Tournament, Quarter Final|| Anshan, China || Decision || 3 || 3:00
|-  bgcolor="#cfc"
| 2015-11-07 || Win ||align=left| Maxim Railean || Wu Lin Feng 2015 –63 kg World Tournament, First Round|| Anshan, China || TKO || 3 ||
|- style="background:#cfc;"
| 2015-07-04 || Win ||align=left| Javier Hernandez || Wu Lin Feng || China || Decision (unanimous) || 3 || 3:00
|- style="background:#cfc;"
| 2015-04-04 || Win ||align=left| Sergio Wielzen || Wu Lin Feng || China || TKO (doctor stoppage)|| 2 || 1:38
|-  bgcolor="#cfc"
| 2015-01-31 || Win ||align=left| Igor Liubchenko || Wu Lin Feng || China || TKO (left hook) ||  ||
|-  style="background:#cfc;"
| 2014-11-01 || Win||align=left| TJ Arcangel || Wu Lin Feng vs WCK || Las Vegas, Nevada || Decision (unanimous) || 3 || 3:00
|-  style="background:#cfc;"
| 2014-09-26 || Win||align=left| Salika || WBK 1 - Ningbo|| Ningbo, China || Decision (unanimous) || 3 || 3:00
|-  style="background:#cfc;"
| 2014-06-06 || Win||align=left| Nicolas Vega || Wu Lin Feng || Wanzhou District, China || ||  ||
|-  style="background:#fbb;"
| 2014-01-25 || Loss ||align=left| Lerdsila Chumpairtour || Kunlun Fight 1 || Pattaya, Thailand || Decision (unanimous) || 3 || 3:00
|-  style="background:#fbb;"
| 2013-12-06 || Loss ||align=left| Songchai ||Wu Lin Feng || Luoyang, China || KO ||  ||
|-  style="background:#fbb;"
| 2013-11-02|| Loss || align=left| Lerdsila Chumpairtour || WCK Muay Thai vs. Wulinfeng 2013 || Las Vegas, Nevada || Decision (Unanimous) || 5 || 3:00 
|-
! style=background:white colspan=9 |
|-
|-  style="background:#cfc;"
| 2013-10-20 || Win||align=left| Claudio Amoruso||   || China ||  ||  ||
|-  style="background:#cfc;"
| 2013-08-30 || Win||align=left| Jack || Wu Lin Feng || New Zealand ||  ||  ||
|-  style="background:#fbb;"
| 2013-08-10 || Loss||align=left| Jomthong Chuwattana || Max Muay Thai 3 || Zhengzhou, China || KO (knee) || 1 ||
|-  style="background:#cfc;"
| 2013-06-30 || Win||align=left| Lak ||  ||  China || Decision || 5|| 3:00
|-  style="background:#cfc;"
| 2013-05-03 || Win||align=left| Phaophuri || WCK MuayThai World Championship || Sichuan, China || KO || 3|| 
|-
! style=background:white colspan=9 |
|-  style="background:#cfc;"
| 2013-03-23 || Win||align=left| || Wu Lin Feng || Henan Province, China || Decision  || 3|| 3:00
|-  style="background:#cfc;"
| 2013-02-02 || Win||align=left| Choi Gi Hyuk || K-1 Korea MAX 2013 || Seoul, South Korea || Decision (Unanimous) || 3|| 3:00
|-  style="background:#cfc;"
| 2012-11-14 || Win || align=left| Lerdsila Chumpairtour || WCK Muay Thai "Wulinfeng Spectacular" || Las Vegas, Nevada || Decision (Split) || 5 || 3:00 
|-  
! style=background:white colspan=9 |Wins the WCK Muaythai Lightweight World Title -60 kg.
|-  style="background:#fbb;"
| 2012-05-04 || Loss ||align=left| Xie Lei || Wu Lin Feng || Zhengzhou, China || Decision (unanimous) || 3 || 3:00
|-  style="background:#cfc;"
| 2011-08 || Win||align=left| || Libogen Fight Night || Hong Kong || KO (knee) || ||
|-
| colspan=9 | Legend:

Mixed martial arts record

|-
|Loss
|align=center| 0–1
|Alexander Danilov
|Submission (Rear Naked Choke)
|Glory of Heroes 36: Meishan
|
|align=center| 1
|align=center| 2:47
|Sichuan, China
|

External links
 Official K-1 profile

References 

Chinese male kickboxers
Featherweight kickboxers
Chinese male mixed martial artists
Mixed martial artists utilizing Muay Thai
1991 births
Living people
Chinese Muay Thai practitioners
People from Xinyu
Sportspeople from Jiangxi